Four ships of the United States Navy have been named Astoria, after the town of Astoria, Oregon.

 , was laid down in 1867, but renamed Omaha prior to her commissioning.
 , a cargo ship, was seized by US Customs at the outbreak of World War I.
 , was a heavy cruiser commissioned in 1934 and lost in the Battle of Savo Island in 1942.
 , was a light cruiser commissioned in 1944, and decommissioned in 1949.

Sources

United States Navy ship names